Dabangg 2 is a 2012 Indian Hindi-language action comedy film directed and produced by Arbaaz Khan under Arbaaz Khan Productions. It is a sequel to Dabangg (2010), and the second installment of Dabangg series. The film stars Salman Khan, Sonakshi Sinha, Prakash Raj and Arbaaz Khan while Mahie Gill, Vinod Khanna, Nikitin Dheer, Pankaj Tripathi, Manoj Pahwa and Deepak Dobriyal play supporting roles.

Dabangg 2 was theatrically released in India on 21 December 2012 during the Christmas festival. It earned  nett in India within three days of its release to break the record of Ek Tha Tiger (2012), another film featuring Salman Khan. The film accumulated  nett and was termed a "blockbuster" by Box Office India. The third film in the franchise, Dabangg 3, was released in December 2019.

Plot
The story carries on from the previous film— Inspector Chulbul Pandey— in charge of a local police station in Kanpur and resides there with his wife Rajjo, half brother Makkhi and stepfather. A boy gets kidnapped from a school, therefore Chulbul deals with the problem. In Kanpur, an assassin murders a witness who is about to testify against a dreaded don. Chulbul tracks the assassin down, killing him at a coffeehouse. The don is Thakur Bachcha Singh, a struggling politician. After several public altercations, Bachcha's brother Genda convinces him to get rid of Pandey, threatening Chulbul's stepfather to kill his entire family if Chulbul keeps on interfering in Bachcha's criminal activities.

Genda harasses a girl, arriving at her wedding to kidnap her. Chulbul arrives at the wedding and asks Genda to leave. Genda refuses to comply and continues to insult Chulbul. Chulbul breaks his neck, leading to his death. In the meantime, his wife becomes pregnant, Pandey being advised by everybody to leave Bachcha alone for the sake of his family's safety. Bachcha, promising to avenge his brother's death, decides to do so before the election. He meets Rajjo and Makkhi while they are leaving a temple where Makkhi is shot by Bachcha, and Rajjo is pushed off the temple stairs. However, both of them survive, with Rajjo having a miscarriage and suffering a head injury.

Chulbul is enraged at the loss of his first child. He enters Bachcha's location and kills all of his men. He fights him and gets him arrested, but when Bachcha tries to threaten him, he kills him instantly by grabbing a gun and shooting him with two bullets in the chest. Later, Chulbul and Rajjo have their first child, a baby boy. Right at the end, Chedi Singh's photographer (from the first film, Dabangg) arrives, asking for a family photo. They all laugh, and the photographer takes the picture.

Cast

 Salman Khan as Inspector Chulbul Pandey
 Sonakshi Sinha as Rajjo Pandey
 Arbaaz Khan as Makhanchand "Makkhi" Pandey
 Prakash Raj as Thakur Bachcha Singh, a politician and the main antagonist
 Vinod Khanna as Prajapati Pandey
 Mahie Gill as Nirmala Pandey
 Nikitin Dheer as Chunni, the secondary antagonist
 Deepak Dobriyal as Genda Singh, Bachcha's brother
 Gireesh Sahedev as Inspector Siddique
 Manoj Pahwa as Commissioner SP Anand Mathur
 Flora Asha Saini in a cameo as a reporter
 Madhumita Das as Raina Tripathi
 Sandeepa Dhar as Anjali Prasad
 Tinu Anand as the master in a special appearance
 Manoj Joshi as a shopkeeper in a special appearance
 Nitesh Pandey as a doctor in a special appearance
 Pankaj Tripathi as Filawar
 Rashami Desai in a cameo appearance in song "Dagabaaz Re"
 Nandish Sandhu in a cameo appearance in song "Dagabaaz Re"
 Achyut Potdar as Beni Prasad, Anjali's Grandfather 
 Malaika Arora Khan as Munni, a bar dancer in the item number song "Pandeyji Seeti"
 Kareena Kapoor as a bar dancer in the item number song "Fevicol Se"

Production

Development
When director Abhinav Kashyap opted out of directing the sequel, Arbaaz Khan himself decided to helm the film. Prakash Raj was confirmed to have been chosen to play the main villain. Kareena Kapoor has chosen to play an item number in the film, despite initial reports considering Katrina Kaif for the role.

In Feb 2012, it was reported that distribution rights were sold to UTV Motion Pictures for a price of  1.40 billion, the highest for a Bollywood film till date. But later UTV Motion Pictures reported the news as completely fake & nonsense. UTV Motion Pictures has brushed aside rumours of purchasing the rights of the sequel to Salman Khan-Sonakshi Sinha starrer, Dabangg 2 for  1.40 billion.
The national emblem framed on the wall of Chulbul Pandey's police station was depicted incorrectly. Sensitive to the slightest abnormality pertaining to national sentiments, the Central Board of Film Certification (CBFC) has asked producer-director Arbaaz Khan to simply blur the corner of the film's frames where the national emblem appears.

Filming
Shooting for the film began in March 2012. The producers announced plans to shoot the film in Kanpur. A set depicting the city of Kanpur was created at the Kamalistan Studios in Mumbai, where the first schedule of the film was shot. The entire studio was rented for the film, making it a first in Bollywood. The phase consisted of shooting a qawwali song under neon lights. Following the shoot, filming is expected to take place in film city in Mumbai. The last schedule has been planned to be shot at Satara. Three days after the film went on floors, it was reported that Salman Khan replaced cinematographer, K. K. Senthil Kumar, with Aseem Kumar. A song titled "Fevicol Se" was choreographed as a dance number and considered as an equivalent to "Munni Badnaam Hui" from prequel. Reports indicating that Salman would essay an important involvement in the director's role were dismissed by Arbaaz.

Pre-release business
{| class="wikitable sortable"  style="margin:auto; margin:auto;"
|+Dabangg 2 Pre-release business'''
! Territories and ancillary revenues
! Price
|-
|  Satellite rights with a TV channel
| 
|-
| Overseas & home video rights with Eros International
| 
|-
| Music rights (T-Series)
|
|-
|Total
|
|-
|}
 The figures don't include the Print and Advertising (P&A) costs.

Soundtrack
The songs are composed by Sajid–Wajid while the lyrics were penned by Jalees Sherwani, Irfan Kamal, and Sameer. The film score is composed by Sandeep Shirodkar. The full soundtrack album was released on 9 November 2012.

"Pandeyji Seeti" appears to be inspired by the song "Chalat Musafir" from the film Teesri Kasam (1966), which in turn was inspired by a Bihari folk song, and added little sample of previous song Munni Badnaam Hui, which this song "Pandeyji Seeti", became sequel of this song In turn, "Pandeyji Seeti" itself appears to have inspired the song "Badri Ki Dulhania" in the film Badrinath Ki Dulhania (2017). The song "Fevicol Se", which showed Kareena Kapoor, sung by same singer Mamta Sharma.

Track listing

Marketing
The first look of the film was unveiled on 19 October 2012 and theatrical trailer was launched on 20 October 2012 at Salman Khan's reality show Bigg Boss 6. Chulbul Pandey, Khan's character in Dabangg 2 appeared in StarPlus soap Diya Aur Baati Hum to promote the film. It aired on 12 and 13 December 2012. Salman and Sonakshi promoted the film on the sets of Sa Re Ga Ma Pa. Dabangg 2 was screened at the Ketnav theatre in Khar, a western Mumbai suburb, on 17 December 2012. A Dabangg 2 special screening was done for the star kids on 19 December 2012. Another premiere was held on 20 December 2012 in which Aamir Khan also attended.

ReleaseDabangg 2 released in 3500 screens in India and 450 screens overseas on 21 December 2012. The film was made on a budget of  including prints and advertising. This figure does not include Salman Khan's fee which can go as high as the budget of the film itself. Dabangg 2 had the highest screen count for any film in India and worldwide, surpassing that of Ek Tha Tiger. The trailers for Kai Po Che! and Bhaag Milkha Bhaag were released with Dabangg 2.

Controversy
Chief judicial magistrate (CJM), Muzaffarpur has ordered to lodge an FIR against seven artists of Dabangg 2, including Salman Khan, Arbaaz Khan, Kareena Kapoor, Sonakshi Sinha, and others under Section 156 (clause 3) of the CrPC and submit a report within a week in connection with a complaint filed against a song "Fevicol...." in Hindi movie Dabangg 2. The complainant filed the case demanding a ban on the song immediately, claiming that such songs are likely to fuel sexual harassment and misbehaviour against girls at a time when the entire nation was experiencing an unprecedented shame due to the recent gang rape and death of a 23-year-old girl in Delhi.

Reception
Critical Reception
Dabangg 2 received mixed reviews from critics. Taran Adarsh of Bollywood Hungama gave the film 4 out of 5 stars and said "Dabangg 2 has Salman Khan, Salman Khan and Salman Khan plus entertainment, entertainment and entertainment in large doses". Resham Sengar of Zee TV rated the film 3.5 out of 5 stars, noting "But the actor cum director has kept the standards of the film intact like a pro. So much so that it was hard to believe that a newbie in film making has directed the film. So, go on and book your ticket to enjoy this paisa vasool film with your friends and family and don't forget to grab a tub of popcorn". Srijana Mitra Das of The Times of India gave the film 3.5 out of 5 stars and praised the overall style. Mid-Day gave it 3 out of 5 stars and said the film was a treat for diehard Salman Khan fans. Rubina Khan of First Post India gave the film 3 out of 5 stars and said it didn't matter what score she gave the film, it would still do great business. Filmfare stated "Dabangg 2 is a fanboy's dream and wouldn't disappoint the first comer either".

Saibal Chatterjee of NDTV gave the film a score 2.5 out of 5 stars reviewing "This film might also end up raking in a much larger box office booty than Dabangg did, but assessed strictly as a pure entertainer designed for instant mass gratification, it isn't half as successful. Unfortunately, the Dabangg 2 screenplay is devoid of any fresh ideas". Gaurav Malani, also from The Times of India gave the film a mixed review and recommended skipping it by "watching reruns of Dabangg on television". Raja Sen of Rediff gave it 2.5 out of 5 stars and felt Dabangg 2 was less unwatchable than its predecessor and it had "absolutely nothing new to offer, and nothing to remember, quote or take away from the theatre". The Indian Express rated the film 2.5 out of 5 stars and said "Arbaaz should have given himself some more time" to make the film watchable. Stardust publishers Manga gave the film 2.5 out of 5 stars also calling it a "one-time watch potboiler". Anupama Chopra of the Hindustan Times gave the film 2.5 out of 5 stars and said Dabangg 2 does not match "the zing of the original" and "there wasn't one line that stayed with me after the film". Rajeev Masand of CNN-IBN gave the film 2.5 out of 5 stars and stated what the "film needed was personality and character, what it's left with is sameness. But that's probably enough for Salman Khan fans".

Aniruddha Guha also of DNA India rated the film 2 out of 5 stars and called it "wannabe-Dabangg". After giving it a 2 out of 5 stars, the Daily Bhaskar panned Dabangg 2 by saying "you'd feel like a moron spending the last day on planet Earth filling your mind and lowering your IQ with rubbish like this". Business of Cinema gave the film 2 out of 5 stars and said it was a copy of the original and offered nothing new. Reuters gave it a negative review and raised objections to the content and said the film "objectified women in the worst way possible". Sanjukta Sharma from Live Mint (The Wall Street Journal) said "Dabangg 2 is a disappointment. It had nothing to keep me engaged".

IGN gave the film 4.5 out of 10 stars and criticized the weak script and direction. Mufaddal Fakhruddin wrote, "the screenplay and script are majorly lacking, and whatever story it does have is stretched out in a way that it becomes blatantly obvious. There were a number of times where I went, "why did I just watch this scene?". Dabangg 2 felt lost. They say not all those who wander are lost, but Dabangg 2 actually is. Digital Spy gave the film 2 out of 5 stars and objected to the content. Priya Joshi wrote, "Khan revels in the shameless display of narcissism, but there is little to commend the performance. The dialog is trite, there is no depth to the characters, and most of the effort has been applied to the elaborate fight sequences. With the emphasis on violence and the objectifying of women, it's a step back in time, where the women are either dutiful, temple-going housewives or cleavage-baring prostitutes". Joshi recommended skipping the film and added instead of watching it, we could "use the time, perhaps more wisely, pondering whether we have enough brussels for Christmas dinner". Asian review website Wogma rated the film 1.18 out of 5 and criticized all aspects, from direction to performances by the lead actors. The reviewer broke down the rating of the film and gave "1 out of 5 for direction, 1 out of 5 for the story, 1 out of 5 for lead actors performances, 2 out of 5 for character artists, 2 out of 5 for dialogues, 1 out of 5 for screenplay, 1.5 out of 5 for the music, and 1 out of 5 for lyrics". Simon Abrams of The Village Voice said "before they really screw up [the film], Dabangg 2s creators do a good job of not taking themselves too seriously". Trisha Gupta from First Post International said the film was a rehash of Dabangg. Instead of giving a review, the New York Daily Times objected to the content of the film. Quoting William Nicholas Gomes, a visiting fellow at the University of York, they said Dabangg 2 "glorified the practice of torture by police forces" and would "raise wider public support in favour of torture and ill treatment [of prisoners] in custody".

Accolades

Box office

IndiaDabangg 2 was the second-highest grosser of the year behind Ek Tha Tiger. It netted  on its opening day, the biggest non-holiday opener beating the previous record held by Rowdy Rathore. After a successful weekend, the film had a strong Monday where it made , beating the previous record held by Dabangg. The film was declared a blockbuster by Box Office India after its first week. According to Box Office India, the film became the second highest-grossing film of 2012 in 13 days, adding  30 million nett on that day. Dabangg 2 collected solid figures of  nett in its second week. After successful two weeks, the film further netted  in third weekend to make a total of around  nett. It netted around  nett after the completion of its theatrical run.

OverseasDabangg 2 collected close to US$8.5 million overseas in its opening weekend. The film reached $8 million overseas in 10 days and was declared a 'super-hit' by Box Office India. Dabangg 2 has taken its overseas total to around $10.25 million in 17 days and has become the third biggest overseas hit of 2012 behind Jab Tak Hai Jaan and Ek Tha Tiger, both of which earned the 'blockbuster' status overseas. Dabangg 2 grossed around $11.75 million in its total lifetime.

Sequel
It has been reported that Dabangg 3'' a sequel which will be the third and last installment in the Dabangg (film series) starring Salman Khan and Sudeep was released on 20 December 2019.

References

Development

Filming

Marketing

Release

Critical Reception

Box office

External links 
 
 
 
 
 Dabangg 2 at JioCinema

2010s Hindi-language films
2012 masala films
2010s vigilante films
2012 action comedy films
2012 comedy films
2012 directorial debut films
2012 films
Fictional portrayals of the Uttar Pradesh Police
Films set in Kanpur
Films shot in Mumbai
Indian action comedy films
Indian films about revenge
Indian police films
Indian pregnancy films
Indian sequel films
Indian vigilante films